Brodmann area 30, also known as agranular retrolimbic area 30, is a subdivision of the cytoarchitecturally defined retrosplenial region of the cerebral cortex. In the human it is located in the isthmus of cingulate gyrus. Cytoarchitecturally it is bounded internally by the granular retrolimbic area 29, dorsally by the ventral posterior cingulate area 23 and ventrolaterally by the ectorhinal area 36 (Brodmann-1909).

See also

 Brodmann area

30
Medial surface of cerebral hemisphere